Palos may refer to:


Arts and entertainment
Two drums, the palos major and palos menor, used in the music of the Dominican Republic
Palo (flamenco), a flamenco musical forms
Palos (TV series), a 2008 Philippine TV series

Military
Battle of Cape Palos (1815), battle of the Second Barbary War
Battle of Cape Palos (1938), battle of the Spanish Civil War

Places
Palos de la Frontera, a municipality in Spain, from where Columbus sailed in 1492
Palos Verdes, a place in Los Angeles, California, U.S.
Cape Palos, cape on the Mediterranean coast of Spain
Palos, Illinois (disambiguation), several communities within Palos Township
Paloș (disambiguation), several places in Romania
Palos Site, Native American archaeological site in Illinois

People
Enrique Palos (born 1986), Mexican football goalkeeper

See also 
 Palo (disambiguation)